The 2019 Nottingham Open (also known as the Nature Valley Open for sponsorship purposes) was a professional tennis tournament played on outdoor grass courts. It was the 12th edition of the event for women and the 24th edition for men. It is classified as a WTA International tournament on the 2019 WTA Tour for the women, and as an ATP Challenger Tour event for the men. The event took place at the Nottingham Tennis Centre in Nottingham, United Kingdom from 10 through 16 June 2019.

ATP singles main-draw entrants

Seeds

 1 Rankings are as of 27 May 2019.

Other entrants
The following players received wildcards into the main draw:
  Liam Broady
  Jack Draper
  Dan Evans
  Evan Hoyt
  Paul Jubb

The following player received entry into the singles main draw as a special exempt:
  Ivo Karlović

The following player received entry into the singles main draw as an alternate:
  Ernesto Escobedo

The following players received entry from the qualifying draw:
  Brydan Klein
  Ryan Peniston

WTA singles main-draw entrants

Seeds

 1 Rankings are as of 27 May 2019.

Other entrants
The following players received wildcards into the main draw:
  Naiktha Bains
  Maia Lumsden
  Katie Swan

The following player received entry using a protected ranking into the main draw:
  Shelby Rogers

The following players received entry from the qualifying draw:
  Magdalena Fręch
  Danielle Lao
  Tara Moore 
  Ellen Perez 
  Elena-Gabriela Ruse 
  Liudmila Samsonova

The following players received entry as lucky losers:
  Chloé Paquet
  Ankita Raina

Withdrawals
  Ashleigh Barty → replaced by  Dalila Jakupović
  Katie Boulter → replaced by  Astra Sharma
  Mihaela Buzărnescu → replaced by  Sara Sorribes Tormo
  Vitalia Diatchenko → replaced by  Bernarda Pera
  Daria Gavrilova → replaced by  Jennifer Brady
  Camila Giorgi → replaced by  Monica Niculescu
  Johanna Konta → replaced by  Heather Watson
  Anastasia Potapova → replaced by  Ivana Jorović
  Yulia Putintseva → replaced by  Chloé Paquet
  Barbora Strýcová → replaced by  Harriet Dart
  Markéta Vondroušová → replaced by  Shelby Rogers
  Dayana Yastremska → replaced by  Ankita Raina

Retirements
  Magdaléna Rybáriková (respiratory infection)

WTA doubles main-draw entrants

Seeds

1 Rankings are as of 27 May 2019.

Other entrants
The following pairs received wildcards into the doubles main draw:
  Naiktha Bains /  Freya Christie
  Sarah Beth Grey /  Eden Silva

Champions

Men's singles

 Dan Evans def.  Evgeny Donskoy 7–6(7–3), 6–3.

Women's singles

  Caroline Garcia def.  Donna Vekić, 2–6, 7–6(7–4), 7–6(7–4)

Men's doubles

 Santiago González /  Aisam-ul-Haq Qureshi def.  Gong Maoxin /  Zhang Ze 4–6, 7–6(7–5), [10–5].

Women's doubles

  Desirae Krawczyk /  Giuliana Olmos def.  Ellen Perez /  Arina Rodionova, 7–6(7–5), 7–5

References

External links
 Website

2019 WTA Tour
2019 ATP Challenger Tour
2019
2019 in English tennis
June 2019 sports events in the United Kingdom
2019 Nottingham Open